Turks in South Africa refers to the ethnic Turkish community living in South Africa.

History

Ottoman era
Turks began immigrating to South Africa during the 19th century. In 1889, the Ottoman Empire sent and maintained Honorary Consulates in Johannesburg and Durban.  By April 1914, Mehmet Remzi Bey was assigned as Consul General of the Ottoman Empire to Johannesburg; he died in 1916 and was buried in the Braamfontein cemetery in Johannesburg. On 21 November 2011, his remains were transferred to a memorial garden at the Nizamiye Mosque in Johannesburg.

At the request of the members of the sizeable community of Muslim Cape Malays living in the Cape Colony, the Ottoman government sent Abu Bakr Effendi of Kurdish descent to Cape Town to teach as well as preach Islam and help settle religious matters among Muslims. His descendants still live in various parts of South Africa.

Modern era
At the end of the 1980s, Turkey and South Africa signed some business deals. In 2008, they invested in energy issues to South Africa.

Notable people
Karin Melis Mey
Esmé Emmanuel
Tatamkhulu Afrika
Abu Bakr Effendi

See also 
Turkish diaspora
South Africa–Turkey relations

References

Bibliography

External links
Turkish Embassy in South Africa
 One of the new competitors in Africa: Turkey 

South Africa
 
Ethnic groups in South Africa
 
Islam in South Africa